Jinijini is a town in the Bono Region of Ghana. 'Gyenegyene' is the Akan (Ghanaian Language) word for Jinijini which means pure, clear, still (of water). It is the capital town for Berekum West district which was inaugurated on 15 March 2018. It is about 7 km, 39 km and 412 km away from Berekum, Sunyani and Accra respectively. Jinijini is also known for the Jinijini Senior High School (Jinss); a second cycle institution  which started around mid 1990. The school celebrated its 20th anniversary in 2011.

References

Populated places in the Bono Region